The Artigas Mausoleum is a monument to Uruguayan hero José Artigas, located in Plaza Independencia, in the neighbourhood of Ciudad Vieja, Montevideo. It opened in 1977. Artigas's remains are kept in an underground room underneath the statue. The monument is guarded by two traditional guards called "Blandengues de Artigas".

Burials in Montevideo
Monuments and memorials in Montevideo
Ciudad Vieja, Montevideo
José Gervasio Artigas
1977 establishments in Uruguay
Buildings and structures completed in 1977
Mausoleums in Uruguay